Tephritis rufina is a species of tephritid or fruit flies in the genus Tephritis of the family Tephritidae.

Distribution
Italy.

References

Tephritinae
Insects described in 1871
Diptera of Europe
Taxa named by Camillo Rondani